The 2001 Individual Ice Speedway World Championship was the 36th edition of the World Championship  The Championship was held as a Grand Prix series over eight rounds. 

Kirilł Drogalin won his third world title.

Classification

See also 
 2001 Speedway Grand Prix in classic speedway
 2001 Team Ice Racing World Championship

References 

Ice speedway competitions
World